The Roman Catholic Diocese of Kabgayi is a diocese located in the city of Kabgayi in the Ecclesiastical province of Kigali in Rwanda.

History
 April 25, 1922: The Apostolic Vicariate of Ruanda was established from the northern part of the Apostolic Vicariate of Kivu.
 February 14, 1952: The Apostolic Vicariate of Ruanda was divided into the Apostolic Vicariate of Kabgayi and the Apostolic Vicariate of Nyundo.
 November 10, 1959: The Apostolic Vicariate of Kabgayi was promoted as Metropolitan Archdiocese of Kabgayi.
 April 10, 1976: Demoted as Diocese of Kabgayi; became a suffragan of Kigali

Bishops
Vicars Apostolic of Ruanda (Roman rite)
 Bishop Léon-Paul Classe, M. Afr. (1922.04.10 - 1945.01.31)
 Bishop Laurent-François Déprimoz, M. Afr. (1945.01.31 – 1952.02.14 see below)
 Vicars Apostolic of Kabgayi (Roman rite) 
 Bishop Laurent-François Déprimoz, M. Afr. (see above 1952.02.14 – 1955.04.15)
 Bishop André Perraudin, M. Afr. (1955.12.19 – 1959.11.10 see below)
 Metropolitan Archbishop of Kabgayi (Roman rite) 
 Archbishop André Perraudin, M. Afr. (see above 1959.11.10 – 1976.04.10 see below)
 Bishops of Kabgayi (Roman rite)
 Archbishop (personal title) André Perraudin, M. Afr. (see above 1976.04.10 – 1989.10.07)
 Bishop Thaddée Nsengiyumva (1989.10.07 – 1994.06.0)
 Fr. André Sibomana (Apostolic Administrator 1994.11.11 – 1996.03.13)
 Bishop Anastase Mutabazi (1996.03.13 – 2004.12.10)
 Bishop Smaragde Mbonyintege (2006.01.21 - )

Coadjutor Bishops
Laurent-François Déprimoz, M. Afr. (1943-1945), as Coadjutor Vicar Apostolic
Thaddée Nsengiyumva (1987-1989)

Other priests of this diocese who became bishops
Jean-Baptiste Gahamanyi, appointed Bishop of Astrida in 1961
Joseph Sibomana, appointed Bishop of Ruhengeri in 1961

See also
Roman Catholicism in Rwanda

References

External links
 GCatholic.org 
 Catholic Hierarchy 

Roman Catholic dioceses in Rwanda
Christian organizations established in 1922
Roman Catholic dioceses and prelatures established in the 20th century